Marshall Bruce Mathers III (born October 17, 1972), known professionally as Eminem (often stylized as EMINƎM), is an American rapper, songwriter, and record producer. He is credited with popularizing hip hop in middle America and is critically acclaimed as one of the greatest rappers of all time. Eminem's global success and acclaimed works are widely regarded as having broken racial barriers for the acceptance of white rappers in popular music. While much of his transgressive work during the late 1990s and early 2000s made him widely controversial, he came to be a representation of popular angst of the American underclass and has been cited as an influence for many artists of various genres.

After the release of his debut album Infinite (1996) and the extended play Slim Shady EP (1997), Eminem signed with Dr. Dre's Aftermath Entertainment and subsequently achieved mainstream popularity in 1999 with The Slim Shady LP. His next two releases, The Marshall Mathers LP (2000) and The Eminem Show (2002), were worldwide successes and were both nominated for the Grammy Award for Album of the Year. After the release of his next album, Encore (2004), Eminem went on hiatus in 2005, largely due to a prescription drug addiction. He returned to the music industry four years later with the release of Relapse (2009) and Recovery was released the following year. Recovery was the best-selling album worldwide of 2010, making it Eminem's second album, after The Eminem Show in 2002, to be the best-selling album of the year worldwide. In the following years, he released the US number one albums The Marshall Mathers LP 2 (2013), Revival (2017), Kamikaze (2018) and Music to Be Murdered By (2020).

Eminem made his debut in the film industry with the musical drama film 8 Mile (2002), playing a fictionalized version of himself, and his track "Lose Yourself" from its soundtrack won the Academy Award for Best Original Song, making him the first hip hop artist ever to win the award. Eminem has made cameo appearances in the films The Wash (2001), Funny People (2009) and The Interview (2014) and the television series Entourage (2010). He has also developed other ventures, including Shady Records, a joint venture with manager Paul Rosenberg, which helped launch the careers of artists such as 50 Cent, D12 and Obie Trice, among others. He has also established his own channel, Shade 45, on Sirius XM Radio.

In addition to his solo career, Eminem was a member of the hip hop group D12. He is also known for collaborations with fellow Detroit-based rapper Royce da 5'9"; the two are collectively known as Bad Meets Evil.

Eminem is among the best-selling music artists of all time, with estimated worldwide sales of over 220 million records. He was the best-selling music artist in the United States of the 2000s and the best-selling male music artist in the United States of the 2010s, third overall. Billboard named him the "Artist of the Decade (2000–2009)". He has had ten number-one albums on the Billboard 200—which all consecutively debuted at number one on the chart, making him the first artist to achieve this—and five number-one singles on the Billboard Hot 100. The Marshall Mathers LP, The Eminem Show, Curtain Call: The Hits (2005), "Lose Yourself", "Love the Way You Lie" and "Not Afraid" have all been certified Diamond or higher by the Recording Industry Association of America (RIAA). Rolling Stone has included him in its lists of the 100 Greatest Artists of All Time and the 100 Greatest Songwriters of All Time. He has won numerous awards, including 15 Grammy Awards, eight American Music Awards, 17 Billboard Music Awards, an Academy Award, a Primetime Emmy Award and an MTV Europe Music Global Icon Award. In November 2022, Eminem was inducted into the Rock and Roll Hall of Fame.

Early life 
Mathers was born on October 17, 1972, in St. Joseph, Missouri, the only child of Marshall Bruce Mathers Jr. and Deborah Rae "Debbie" (née Nelson). He is of English, Scottish, German, Swiss, Polish, and Luxembourgish ancestry. His mother nearly died during her 73-hour labor with him. Eminem's parents were in a band called Daddy Warbucks, playing in Ramada Inns along the DakotasMontana border before they separated. Eminem's father, Bruce Jr., left the family, moving to California after having two other children: Michael and Sarah. His mother, Debbie, later had a son named Nathan "Nate" Kane Samara. During his childhood, Eminem and his mother shuttled between Detroit and Missouri, rarely staying in one house for more than a year or two and living primarily with family members. In Missouri, they lived in several places, including St. Joseph, Savannah and Kansas City.

As a teenager, Eminem wrote letters to his father. Debbie said that they all came back marked "return to sender". When he was a child, a bully named D'Angelo Bailey severely injured Eminem's head in an assault, an incident which Eminem later recounted (with comic exaggeration) on the song "Brain Damage". Debbie filed a lawsuit against the public school for this in 1982. The suit was dismissed the following year by a Macomb County, Michigan judge, who said the schools were immune from lawsuits. For much of his youth, Eminem and his mother lived in a working-class, primarily black, Detroit neighborhood. He and Debbie were one of three white households on their block, and Eminem was beaten several times by black youths.

As a child, he was interested in storytelling, aspiring to be a comic book artist before discovering hip hop. Eminem heard his first rap song ("Reckless", featuring Ice-T) on the Breakin' soundtrack, a gift from Debbie's half-brother Ronnie Polkingharn. His uncle was close to the boy and later became a musical mentor to him. When Polkingharn committed suicide in 1991, Eminem stopped speaking publicly for days and did not attend his funeral.

Eminem's home life was seldom stable; he frequently fought with his mother, whom a social worker described as having a "very suspicious, almost paranoid personality". When her son became famous, Debbie dismissed criticism, saying that she had sheltered him and was responsible for his success. In 1987, Debbie allowed runaway Kimberly Anne "Kim" Scott to stay at their home. Several years later, Eminem began an on-and-off relationship with Scott. After spending three years in ninth grade due to truancy and poor grades, he dropped out of Lincoln High School at age 17. Although interested in English, Eminem never explored literature (preferring comic books) and he disliked math and social studies. Eminem worked at several jobs to help his mother pay the bills. One of the jobs he had was with Little Caesar's Pizza in Warren, Michigan. He later said she often threw him out of the house anyway, often after taking most of his paycheck. When she left to play bingo, he would blast the stereo and write songs.

At age 14, Eminem began rapping with high-school friend Mike Ruby; they adopted the names "Manix" and "M&M", the latter evolving into "Eminem". Eminem sneaked into neighboring Osborn High School with friend and fellow rapper Proof for lunchroom freestyle rap battles. On Saturdays, they attended open mic contests at the Hip-Hop Shop on West 7 Mile Road, considered "ground zero" for the Detroit rap scene. Struggling to succeed in a predominantly black industry, Eminem was appreciated by underground hip hop audiences. When he wrote verses, he wanted most of the words to rhyme; he wrote long words or phrases on paper and, underneath, worked on rhymes for each syllable. Although the words often made little sense, the drill helped Eminem practice sounds and rhymes.

Career

1988–1997: Early career, Infinite and family struggles 
In 1988, he went by the stage name MC Double M and formed his first group New Jacks and made a self-titled demo tape with DJ Butter Fingers. In 1989, they later joined Bassmint Productions who later changed their name to Soul Intent in 1992 with rapper Proof and other childhood friends. They released a self-titled EP in 1995 featuring Proof. Eminem also made his first music video appearance in 1992 in a song titled, "Do-Da-Dippity", by Champtown. Later in 1996, Eminem and Proof teamed up with four other rappers to form The Dirty Dozen (D12), who released their first album Devil's Night in 2001.

Eminem was soon signed to Jeff and Mark Bass's F.B.T. Productions and recorded his debut album Infinite for their independent Web Entertainment label. The album was a commercial failure upon its release in 1996. One lyrical subject of Infinite was his struggle to raise his newborn daughter, Hailie Jade Scott Mathers, on little money. During this period, Eminem's rhyming style, primarily inspired by rappers Nas, Esham and AZ, lacked the comically violent slant for which he later became known. Detroit disc jockeys largely ignored Infinite and the feedback Eminem did receive ("Why don't you go into rock and roll?") led him to craft angrier, moodier tracks. At this time Eminem and Kim Scott lived in a crime-ridden neighborhood and their house was robbed several times. Eminem cooked and washed dishes for minimum wage at Gilbert's Lodge, a family-style restaurant at St. Clair Shores. His former boss described him as becoming a model employee, as he worked 60 hours a week for six months after Hailie's birth. He was fired shortly before Christmas and later said, "It was, like, five days before Christmas, which is Hailie's birthday. I had, like, forty dollars to get her something." After the release of Infinite, his personal problems and substance abuse culminated in a suicide attempt. By March 1997 he was fired from Gilbert's Lodge for the last time and lived in his mother's mobile home with Kim and Hailie.

1997–1999: Introduction of Slim Shady, The Slim Shady LP and rise to success 

Eminem attracted more attention when he developed Slim Shady, a sadistic, violent alter ego. The character allowed him to express his anger with lyrics about drugs, rape and murder. In the spring of 1997 he recorded his debut EP, the Slim Shady EP, which was released that winter by Web Entertainment. The EP, with frequent references to drug use, sexual acts, mental instability and violence, also explored the more-serious themes of dealing with poverty and marital and family difficulties and revealed his direct, self-deprecating response to criticism. Hip hop magazine The Source featured Eminem in its "Unsigned Hype" column in March 1998.

After he was fired from his job and evicted from his home, Eminem went to Los Angeles to compete in the 1997 Rap Olympics, an annual, nationwide battle rap competition. He placed second and an Interscope Records intern in attendance called Dean Geistlinger asked Eminem for a copy of the Slim Shady EP, which was then sent to company CEO Jimmy Iovine. Iovine played the tape for record producer Dr. Dre, founder of Aftermath Entertainment and founding member of hip hop group N.W.A. Dre recalled, "In my entire career in the music industry, I have never found anything from a demo tape or a CD. When Jimmy played this, I said, 'Find him. Now. He would later state on the fourth and last episode of The Defiant Ones, "I was like: what the fuck!?, and who the fuck is that?" expressing his shock towards Mathers' rapping talent. Although his associates criticized him for hiring a white rapper, he was confident in his decision: "I don't give a fuck if you're purple; if you can kick it, I'm working with you." Eminem had idolized Dre since listening to N.W.A as a teenager and was nervous about working with him on an album: "I didn't want to be starstruck or kiss his ass too much ... I'm just a little white boy from Detroit. I had never seen stars let alone Dr. Dre." He became more comfortable working with Dre after a series of productive recording sessions.

Eminem released The Slim Shady LP in February 1999. Although it was one of the year's most popular albums (certified triple platinum by the end of the year), he was accused of imitating the style and subject matter of underground rapper Cage. The album's popularity was accompanied by controversy over its lyrics; in "'97 Bonnie & Clyde" Eminem describes a trip with his infant daughter when he disposes of his wife's body and in "Guilty Conscience" which encourages a man to murder his wife and her lover. "Guilty Conscience" marked the beginning of a friendship and musical bond between Dr. Dre and Eminem. The label-mates later collaborated on a number of hit songs ("Forgot About Dre" and "What's the Difference" while also providing uncredited vocals on "The Watcher" from Dr. Dre's album 2001, "Bitch Please II" from The Marshall Mathers LP, "Say What You Say" from The Eminem Show, "Encore/Curtains Down" from Encore and "Old Time's Sake" and "Crack a Bottle" from Relapse) and Dre made at least one guest appearance on each of Eminem's Aftermath albums. The Slim Shady LP has been certified quadruple platinum by the RIAA.

1999–2003: The Marshall Mathers LP and The Eminem Show 

After Eminem released The Slim Shady LP, he started his own record label, Shady Records, in late 1999. Eminem looked for an avenue to release D12, and his manager Paul Rosenberg was keen to start a label, which led to the two teaming up to form Shady. Its A&R Marc Labelle has defined the record label as "a boutique label but [with] all the outlets of a major [and] Interscope backing up our every move."

Recorded from 1999 to 2000, The Marshall Mathers LP was released in May 2000. It sold 1.76 million copies in its first week, breaking US records held by Snoop Dogg's Doggystyle for fastest-selling hip hop album and Britney Spears' ...Baby One More Time for fastest-selling solo album. The first single from the album, "The Real Slim Shady", was a success despite controversies about Eminem's insults and dubious claims about celebrities (for example, that Christina Aguilera had performed oral sex on Carson Daly and Fred Durst). In his second single, "The Way I Am", he reveals the pressure from his record company to top "My Name Is". Although Eminem parodied shock rocker Marilyn Manson in the music video for "My Name Is", they are reportedly on good terms; Manson is mentioned in "The Way I Am", appeared in its music video and has performed a live remix of the song with Eminem. In the third single, "Stan" (which samples Dido's "Thank You"), Eminem tries to deal with his new fame, assuming the persona of a deranged fan who kills himself and his pregnant girlfriend (mirroring 97 Bonnie & Clyde" from The Slim Shady LP). The music magazine Q called "Stan" the third-greatest rap song of all time, and it was ranked tenth in a Top40-Charts.com survey. The song has since been ranked 296th on Rolling Stone's "500 Greatest Songs of All Time" list. In July 2000, Eminem was the first white artist to appear on the cover of The Source. The Marshall Mathers LP was certified Diamond by the RIAA in March 2011 and sold 21 million copies worldwide. In 2000 Eminem also appeared in the Up in Smoke Tour with rappers Dr. Dre, Snoop Dogg, Xzibit and Ice Cube and the Family Values Tour with Limp Bizkit, headlining the Anger Management Tour with Papa Roach, Ludacris and Xzibit.

Eminem performed with Elton John at the 43rd Grammy Awards ceremony in 2001, with the Gay & Lesbian Alliance Against Defamation (GLAAD, an organization which considered Eminem's lyrics homophobic) condemning John's decision to perform with Eminem. Entertainment Weekly placed the appearance on its end-of-decade "best-of" list: "It was the hug heard 'round the world. Eminem, under fire for homophobic lyrics, shared the stage with a gay icon for a performance of 'Stan' that would have been memorable in any context." On February 21, the day of the awards ceremony, GLAAD held a protest outside the Staples Center (the ceremony's venue). Eminem was also the only guest artist to appear on fellow rapper Jay-Z's critically acclaimed album The Blueprint, producing and rapping on the song "Renegade".

The Eminem Show was released in May 2002. It was another success, reaching number one on the charts and selling over 1.332 million copies during its first full week. The album's single, "Without Me", denigrates boy bands, Limp Bizkit, Dick and Lynne Cheney, Moby and others. The Eminem Show, certified Diamond by the RIAA, examines the effects of Eminem's rise to fame, his relationship with his wife and daughter and his status in the hip hop community, addressing an assault charge brought by a bouncer he saw kissing his wife in 2000. Although several tracks are clearly angry, Stephen Thomas Erlewine of AllMusic found The Eminem Show less inflammatory than The Marshall Mathers LP. L. Brent Bozell III, who had criticized The Marshall Mathers LP for misogynistic lyrics, noted The Eminem Shows extensive use of obscenity and called Eminem "Eminef" for the prevalence of the word "motherfucker" on the album. The Eminem Show sold 27 million copies worldwide and was the best-selling album of 2002.

2003–2007: Production work, Encore and musical hiatus 

In 2003, Eminem, a lifelong fan of Tupac, provided production work for three tracks on the Tupac Resurrection soundtrack. He would follow this up the next year by producing 12 of the 16 tracks on Tupac's Loyal to the Game album. On December 8, 2003, the United States Secret Service said that it was "looking into" allegations that Eminem had threatened the President of the United States. The cause for concern was the lyrics of "We As Americans" ("Fuck money / I don't rap for dead presidents / I'd rather see the president dead / It's never been said, but I set precedents"), which was later released on a bonus CD with the deluxe edition of Encore.

Encore, released in 2004, was another success, but not as successful as his previous albums. Its sales were partially driven by the first single, "Just Lose It", which contained slurs directed toward Michael Jackson. On October 12, 2004, a week after the release of "Just Lose It", Jackson phoned Steve Harvey's radio show, The Steve Harvey Morning Show, to report his displeasure with its video (which parodies Jackson's child molestation trial, plastic surgery and the 1984 incident when Jackson's hair caught fire during the filming of a commercial). In the song, Eminem says, "That's not a stab at Michael / That's just a metaphor / I'm just psycho." Many of Jackson's friends and supporters spoke out against the video, including Stevie Wonder, who described it as "kicking a man while he's down" and "bullshit", and Steve Harvey (who said, "Eminem has lost his ghetto pass. We want the pass back"). The video also parodied Pee-wee Herman, MC Hammer and Madonna during her Blond Ambition period. "Weird Al" Yankovic, who parodied the Eminem song "Lose Yourself" on "Couch Potato" for his 2003 album Poodle Hat, told the Chicago Sun-Times about Jackson's protest: "Last year, Eminem forced me to halt production on the video for my 'Lose Yourself' parody because he somehow thought that it would be harmful to his image or career. So the irony of this situation with Michael is not lost on me." Although Black Entertainment Television stopped playing the video, MTV announced that it would continue to air it. The Source, through CEO Raymond "Benzino" Scott, called for the video to be pulled, the song removed from the album and Eminem to apologize publicly to Jackson. In 2007, Jackson and Sony bought Famous Music from Viacom, giving him the rights to songs by Eminem, Shakira, Beck and others.

Despite its lead single's humorous theme, Encore explored serious subject matter with the anti-war song "Mosh", which criticized President George W. Bush as "This weapon of mass destruction that we call our president", with lyrics including "Fuck Bush." On October 25, 2004, a week before the 2004 US Presidential election, Eminem released the video for "Mosh" on the Internet. In it, Eminem gathers an army (including rapper Lloyd Banks) of Bush-administration victims and leads them to the White House. When they break in, it is learned that they are there to register to vote; the video ends with "VOTE Tuesday November 2." After Bush's reelection, the video's ending was changed to Eminem and the protesters invading the White House during a speech by the president. Also in 2004 Eminem launched a satellite music channel, Shade 45, on Sirius radio, which was described by his manager as "essentially a destination to get and hear things that other people aren't playing."

Eminem began his first US concert tour in three years in the summer of 2005 with the Anger Management 3 Tour, featuring 50 Cent, G-Unit, Lil Jon, D12, Obie Trice and the Alchemist, but in August he canceled the European leg of the tour, later announcing that he had entered drug rehabilitation for treatment of a "dependency on sleep medication". Meanwhile, industry insiders speculated that Eminem was considering retirement, while rumors circulated that a double album titled The Funeral would be released. In July, the Detroit Free Press reported a possible final bow for Eminem as a solo performer, quoting members of his inner circle as saying that he would embrace the roles of producer and label executive. A greatest hits album, Curtain Call: The Hits, was released on December 6, 2005, by Aftermath Entertainment, and sold nearly 441,000 copies in the US in its first week, marking Eminem's fourth consecutive number-one album on the Billboard Hot 200, and was certified double platinum by the RIAA. However, Eminem suggested that month on WKQI's "Mojo in the Morning" show that he would be taking a break as an artist: "I'm at a point in my life right now where I feel like I don't know where my career is going ... This is the reason that we called it 'Curtain Call' because this could be the final thing. We don't know."

In April 2006, Proof, who was Eminem's childhood friend, was murdered. Eight months later, Eminem released a compilation album titled Eminem Presents: The Re-Up that featured Proof and other Shady Records artists.

2007–2009: Comeback and Relapse 
In September 2007, Eminem called New York radio station WQHT during an interview with 50 Cent, saying that he was "in limbo" and "debating" about when (or if) he would release another album: "I'm always working – I'm always in the studio. It feels good right now, the energy of the label. For a while, I didn't want to go back to the studio ... I went through some personal things. I'm coming out of those personal things [and] it feels good."

Eminem appeared on his Shade 45 Sirius channel in September 2008, saying: "Right now I'm kinda just concentrating on my own stuff, for right now and just banging out tracks and producing a lot of stuff. You know, the more I keep producing the better it seems like I get 'cause I just start knowing stuff." Interscope confirmed that a new album would be released in spring 2009. In December 2008, Eminem provided more details about the album, entitled Relapse: "Me and Dre are back in the lab like the old days, man. Dre will end up producing the majority of the tracks on 'Relapse'. We are up to our old mischievous ways ... let's just leave it at that."

According to a March 5, 2009, press release, Eminem would release two new albums that year. Relapse, the first, was released on May 19; its first single and music video, "We Made You", had been released on April 7. Although Relapse did not sell as well as Eminem's previous albums and received mixed reviews, it was a commercial success and re-established his presence in the hip hop world. It sold more than five million copies worldwide. During the 2009 MTV Movie Awards, Sacha Baron Cohen descended on the audience in an angel costume. He landed buttocks-first on Eminem, who stormed out of the ceremony; three days later, Eminem said that the stunt had been staged. On October 30 he headlined at the Voodoo Experience in New Orleans, his first full performance of the year. Eminem's act included several songs from Relapse, many of his older hits and an appearance by D12. On November 19, he announced on his website that Relapse: Refill would be released on December 21. The album was a re-release of Relapse with seven bonus tracks, including "Forever" and "Taking My Ball". Eminem described the CD:
I want to deliver more material for the fans this year like I originally planned ... Hopefully, these tracks on The Refill will tide the fans over until we put out Relapse 2 next year ... I got back in with Dre and then a few more producers, including Just Blaze, and went in a completely different direction which made me start from scratch. The new tracks started to sound very different than the tracks I originally intended to be on Relapse 2, but I still want the other stuff to be heard.

2009–2011: Recovery and Bad Meets Evil reunion 

On April 14, 2010, Eminem tweeted: "There is no Relapse 2". Although his followers thought he was not releasing an album, he had changed its title to Recovery and confirmed this by tweeting "Recovery" with a link to his website. He said:
I had originally planned for Relapse 2 to come out last year. But as I kept recording and working with new producers, the idea of a sequel to Relapse started to make less and less sense to me, and I wanted to make a completely new album. The music on Recovery came out very different from Relapse, and I think it deserves its own title.

Recorded from 2009 to 2010, Recovery was released on June 18. In the US, Recovery sold 741,000 copies during its first week, topping the Billboard 200 chart. Eminem's sixth consecutive US number-one album also topped the charts in several other countries. Recovery remained atop the Billboard 200 chart for five consecutive weeks of a seven-week total.

Billboard reported that it was the best-selling album of 2010, making Eminem the first artist in Nielsen SoundScan history with two year-end best-selling albums. Recovery is the best-selling digital album in history. Its first single, "Not Afraid", was released on April 29 and debuted atop the Billboard Hot 100; its music video was released on June 4. "Not Afraid" was followed by "Love the Way You Lie", which debuted at number two before rising to the top. Although "Love the Way You Lie" was the best-selling 2010 single in the United Kingdom, it did not reach number one (the first time this has happened in the UK since 1969). Despite criticism of its inconsistency, Recovery received positive reviews from most critics. , the album had US sales of three million copies. Recovery was the best-selling album worldwide in 2010, joining 2002's best-seller The Eminem Show to give Eminem two worldwide year-end number-one albums. With Recovery, Eminem broke the record for the most successive US number-one albums by a solo artist.

He appeared at the 2010 BET Awards, performing "Not Afraid" and "Airplanes, Part II" with B.o.B and Keyshia Cole. Later that year, he performed at the Activison E3 concert. In June, Eminem and Jay-Z announced they would perform together in Detroit and New York City, at concerts called The Home & Home Tour. The first two concerts quickly sold out, prompting an additional show in each city. BET called Eminem the number-one rapper of the 21st century. He opened the 2010 MTV Video Music Awards on September 12, performing "Not Afraid" and "Love the Way You Lie" with Rihanna singing the choruses. Due to the success of Recovery and the Home & Home Tour, Eminem was named the 2010 Hottest MC in the Game by MTV and Emcee of the Year by the online magazine HipHopDX. He and Rihanna again collaborated on "Love the Way You Lie (Part II)", the sequel of their hit single. Unlike the original, Rihanna is the lead vocalist and it is sung from the female perspective. In December 2010, the "Great Eminem Recovery" was number one on Billboards Top 25 Music Moments of 2010. He appeared at the 2011 Grammy Awards on February 13, performing "Love the Way You Lie (Part II)" with Rihanna and Adam Levine and "I Need a Doctor" with Dr. Dre and Skylar Grey. That month it was announced that "Space Bound" would be the fourth single from Recovery, with a music video featuring former porn actress Sasha Grey; the video was released June 24 on the iTunes Store.

In 2010, Eminem again began collaborating with Royce da 5'9" on their first EP as Bad Meets Evil; the duo formed in 1998. The EP, Hell: The Sequel, was released on June 14, 2011. Eminem was featured on Royce da 5'9s "Writer's Block", released on April 8, 2011. On May 3 they released the lead single "Fast Lane" from their upcoming EP and a music video was filmed. In March 2011, within days of each other, The Eminem Show and The Marshall Mathers LP were certified diamond by the RIAA; Eminem is the only rapper with two diamond-certified albums. With more than 60 million "likes" he was the most-followed person on Facebook, outscoring Lady Gaga, Justin Bieber, Rihanna and Michael Jackson. Eminem was the first artist in five years with two number-one albums (Recovery and Hell: The Sequel) in a 12-month period. Early in 2011 he leaked "2.0 Boys", on which Yelawolf and Slaughterhouse collaborated when they signed with Shady Records in January and performed it in April. Bad Meets Evil released their next single, "Lighters", on July 6 and its music video in late August. On August 6, Eminem performed several songs from throughout his career at Lollapalooza with the artists who had been featured on each song.

2012–2014: The Marshall Mathers LP 2 
Eminem announced on May 24, 2012, that he was working on his next album, scheduled for release the following year. Without a title or release date, it was included on a number of "Most Anticipated Albums of 2013" lists (including MTV); Complex ranked it sixth and XXL fifth.

On August 14, "Survival", featuring Liz Rodrigues and produced by DJ Khalil, premiered in the multi-player trailer for the video game Call of Duty: Ghosts. According to a press release, the first single from Eminem's eighth album would be released soon. During the 2013 MTV Video Music Awards, it was announced that the album would be entitled The Marshall Mathers LP 2 (following The Marshall Mathers LP) and was scheduled for release on November 5. Its lead single, "Berzerk", was released on August 25 and debuted at number three on the Billboard Hot 100 chart. Three more singles followed: "Survival" (appearing on the Call of Duty: Ghosts trailer), "Rap God" and "The Monster" (with Rihanna).

The album was released on November 5, by Aftermath Entertainment, Shady Records and Interscope Records. Its standard version had 16 tracks and the deluxe version included a second disc with five additional tracks. The Marshall Mathers LP 2 was Eminem's seventh album to debut atop the Billboard 200 and had the year's second-largest first-week sales. He was the first artist since the Beatles to have four singles in the top 20 of the Billboard Hot 100. In the United Kingdom, The Marshall Mathers LP 2 debuted at number one on the UK Albums Chart. The first American artist with seven consecutive UK number-one albums, he is tied with the Beatles for second place for the most consecutive chart-topping UK albums. The album secured Eminem's position as Canada's best-selling artist and was 2013's best-selling album.

On November 3, Eminem was named the first YouTube Music Awards Artist of the Year, and a week later he received the Global Icon Award at the 2013 MTV EMA Music Awards. On June 10, it was announced that Eminem was the first artist to receive two digital diamond certifications – sales and streams of 10 million and above – by the RIAA (for "Not Afraid" and "Love the Way You Lie"). On July 11 and 12, Eminem played two concerts in Wembley Stadium. At the 57th Grammy Awards, he received Best Rap Album award for The Marshall Mathers LP 2 and Best Rap/Sung Collaboration (with Rihanna) for "The Monster".

2014–2016: Shady XV and Southpaw 

In the summer of 2014, Eminem and Rosenberg began using the hashtag #SHADYXV on social networking sites and Eminem wore a T-shirt with the hashtag onstage. This was later revealed to be the name of an upcoming Shady Records compilation. Shortly afterwards the first single from the album ("Guts Over Fear", featuring singer-songwriter Sia) was released and the album's track list was released on October 29. Shady Records released a cypher to promote the album, in which Eminem did a seven-minute freestyle. "Detroit vs. Everybody" (the album's second single), with Eminem, Dej Loaf, Royce da 5'9", Danny Brown, Big Sean and Trick-Trick, was released on November 11. Shady XV, released on November 24 during Black Friday week, consists of one greatest-hits disc and one disc of new material by Shady Records artists such as D12, Slaughterhouse, Bad Meets Evil and Yelawolf. The album debuted at number three on the Billboard 200 chart, with first-week sales of 138,000 copies in the United States.

The Official Eminem Box Set, a career-spanning, 10-disc vinyl box set, was released on March 12, 2015. The set includes seven of Eminem's eight studio albums (excluding Infinite), the 8 Mile soundtrack, the compilation Eminem Presents: The Re-Up and the greatest hits collection Curtain Call: The Hits. Early in the year, it was announced that he would appear on Tech N9ne's "Speedom (Worldwide Choppers 2)". The song, also featuring Krizz Kaliko, was released on April 20. Eminem also appeared on Yelawolf's "Best Friend", the single from Love Story.

Eminem is the executive producer of the soundtrack on the sports drama Southpaw, with Shady Records. The first single from the soundtrack called 'Phenomenal' was released on June 2, 2015. Another single, "Kings Never Die" by Eminem featuring Gwen Stefani, was released on July 10, 2015, on YouTube via Eminem's Vevo account. Eminem was the first interview of Zane Lowe in Beats 1. The interview streamed online on the Beats 1 radio on July 1, 2015.

Eminem appeared on the public access show Only in Monroe, produced in Monroe, Michigan and was interviewed by guest host Stephen Colbert for an episode that aired July 1, 2015. In the episode Eminem sang snippets of Bob Seger songs at Colbert's prompting and briefly discussed Southpaw. In June 2015, it was revealed that he will serve as the executive producer and music supervisor on the TV series Motor City whose premise will be based upon the 2002 film Narc.

In September 2016, Eminem was featured on Skylar Grey's song, "Kill For You", which appears on her album, Natural Causes. On October 19, 2016, Eminem released a new song called "Campaign Speech", a political hip hop song and announced he was working on a new album. On November 17, 2016, Eminem released a remastered version of 'Infinite' on his YouTube VEVO channel. On November 22, 2016, Eminem released a trailer for a 10-minute short documentary called Partners in Rhyme: The True Story of Infinite.

2017–2019: Revival and Kamikaze 

In February 2017, Eminem appeared on "No Favors", a track from Big Sean's album I Decided. In the song, Eminem calls the newly elected President Donald Trump a "bitch" and also raps about raping conservative social and political commentator Ann Coulter, who is a Trump supporter, with a variety of foreign objects. Coulter responded to the lyrics, stating, "I think it's unfortunate that the left, from Berkeley to Eminem with his rap songs, has normalized violence against women, as Eminem has done." Eminem participated in the 2017 BET Hip Hop Awards' annual cypher, using his verse, a freestyle rap called "The Storm", to further criticize Trump and the administration for, among other things, Trump's focus on National Football League players' protests during "The Star Spangled Banner" over Hurricane Maria recovery efforts and lack of gun control reform in the wake of the 2017 Las Vegas shooting. Eminem ended the cypher by giving an ultimatum saying that Trump supporters cannot be his fans. The verse received wide praise among other rappers following its release. In October 2017, Eminem appeared on "Revenge", a track from Pink's album Beautiful Trauma. It was reported that the Secret Service interviewed Eminem in 2018–2019, regarding threatening lyrics towards President Trump and daughter Ivanka.

Starting in late October 2017, Eminem and Paul Rosenberg began teasing what fans speculated was the title of a new album titled Revival, in the form of advertisements for a fake medication of the same name. Later in November, the first single "Walk on Water" was released, which featured Beyoncé. The song was first performed, by Eminem, at the 2017 MTV Europe Music Awards on November 12, featuring Skylar Grey. He appeared on Saturday Night Live on November 18, performing "Walk on Water", "Stan" and "Love the Way You Lie" with Skylar Grey. On November 28, Dr. Dre posted a video confirming the album's release date as December 15, 2017. On December 8, Eminem released a promotional single titled "Untouchable", which featured a sample from the duo Cheech & Chong. Despite an online leak of the album two days prior, Revival was released as planned on December 15. On January 5, 2018, the second single "River" was released, which featured Ed Sheeran. It became Eminem's eighth consecutive album to top the US Billboard 200 upon release with 197,000 copies sold in its first week. As a result, he became the first musical act to have eight entries in a row debut atop the chart. The album was met with mixed reviews from music critics and is generally considered his worst album. In 2018, an extended edition of "Nowhere Fast" with Kehlani and a remix of "Chloraseptic" featuring 2 Chainz and Phresher were released from Revival.

On August 31, 2018, Eminem released his tenth studio album and first surprise album Kamikaze, making it his second full-length studio album in 8 months. The album topped the Billboard 200, making it his ninth album in a row to do so, after selling 434,000 units in the first week. The album was released as a response to criticism of Revival, his worst rated album. The album was promoted with three singles: "Fall", "Venom", from the 2018 film of the same name and "Lucky You". During the October 15, 2018, episode of the late-night television show Jimmy Kimmel Live!, Eminem performed the song "Venom" at the 103rd floor of the Empire State Building in New York City as a promotion of the album.

On December 1, Eminem released an 11 minute freestyle to his YouTube channel titled 'Kick off'. Eminem collaborated with several artists throughout early 2019, including Boogie, Logic, Ed Sheeran, 50 Cent and Conway the Machine. On February 23, 2019, to celebrate its 20th anniversary, Eminem released a re-issue of The Slim Shady LP, including acapellas, instrumentals and radio edited versions of tracks from the album.

2020–present: Music to Be Murdered By, Super Bowl LVI, Curtain Call 2, and Rock and Roll Hall of Fame induction 
On January 17, 2020, Eminem released another surprise album Music to Be Murdered By. Recorded from 2019 to 2020, the album features guest appearances by Young M.A., Royce da 5'9", Q-Tip, Denaun Porter, White Gold, Ed Sheeran, Juice WRLD, Skylar Grey, Anderson .Paak, Don Toliver, Kxng Crooked, Joell Ortiz and Black Thought. The album debuted at number one on the Billboard 200, selling 279,000 album-equivalent units in its first week. Subsequently, Eminem became the first artist to have ten consecutive albums debut at number one in the US and one of six artists to have released at least ten US number-one albums. Music critics praised Eminem's lyrical abilities and the improved production after Kamikaze, while criticism directed towards the album's formulaic song structure, lack of innovation and shock value.

The lyrics of "Unaccommodating", in which Eminem referenced the 2017 Manchester Arena bombing, drew significant criticism, with many critics finding the lyrics objectionable. The mayor of Manchester denounced the song's lyrics, describing them as "unnecessarily hurtful and deeply disrespectful". The lyrics also drew widespread criticism from victims' relatives and others involved in the attack. On February 9, 2020, Mathers performed "Lose Yourself" at the 92nd Academy Awards. On March 9, 2020, the music video for the song "Godzilla" was released on YouTube through Lyrical Lemonade's channel. The video features Mike Tyson and Dr. Dre. As of October 8, 2022, the music video has over 520.9 million views. On March 11, 2020, Music to Be Murdered By was certified Gold. On July 9, 2020, Kid Cudi's daughter Vada announced via social media that he was releasing a song with Eminem called "The Adventures of Moon Man & Slim Shady" the coming Friday.

A deluxe edition of the album, titled Music to Be Murdered By – Side B, was released on December 18, 2020. Similar to Eminem's previous two albums, it was released without any prior announcement. It contains a bonus disc with sixteen new tracks, with guest appearances by Skylar Grey, DJ Premier, Ty Dolla Sign, Dr. Dre, Sly Pyper, MAJ and White Gold. The album's release was accompanied by a music video for "Gnat", directed by Cole Bennett. Music to Be Murdered By – Side B debuted on the Billboard 200 at number 3, with 70,000–80,000 album-equivalent units, including 25,000–30,000 in pure album sales. In the track "Zeus", he apologizes to Rihanna over a leaked song from his Relapse studio sessions in which he sided with Chris Brown, who pleaded guilty to felony assault involving her in 2009.

He announced on September 28, 2021, on his social media that he would be featured in a song with Polo G and Mozzy called "Last One Standing" by Skylar Grey for the soundtrack of the film, Venom: Let There Be Carnage, released on September 30, 2021.

Eminem performed alongside LL Cool J at the Rock and Roll Hall of Fame ceremony on October 30, 2021.

On February 13, 2022, Eminem performed at the Super Bowl LVI halftime show alongside Dr. Dre, Snoop Dogg, Kendrick Lamar, and Mary J. Blige, with surprise appearances from 50 Cent and Anderson. Paak.

Eminem announced on May 23, 2022, on his Instagram that he and CeeLo Green will collaborate on a new track titled "The King and I" which will be produced by Dr. Dre and will appear on the Baz Luhrmann's Elvis movie soundtrack. It was released on June 16, 2022, a week prior to its announced date.

On June 24, 2022, Eminem and Snoop Dogg released a song entitled "From the D to the LBC" to squash their beef which started with an interview of Snoop Dogg with Breakfast Club and a subsequent diss by Eminem on the song "Zeus" from Music to be Murdered By – Side B. Eminem had previously confirmed on "Killer (Remix)" that Dr. Dre had stepped in to squash the beef, but Snoop announced a collaboration to squash it once and for all. The two had previously collaborated on the track "Bitch Please II" from Eminem's sophomore album The Marshall Mathers LP. The song's music video was also released the same day after the two unveiled it at Apefest.

Eminem announced his second greatest hits album on July 11, 2022, entitled Curtain Call 2, which is a sequel to his first compilation Curtain Call: The Hits. The album will cover his albums from Relapse to Music to Murdered By, as well as collaborations and songs from movie soundtracks. It was released on August 5, 2022, and also includes "The King and I", "From the D 2 the LBC", and an additional new track named Is This Love ('09) featuring 50 Cent.

On August 26, 2022, Eminem was featured alongside Kanye West on the remix of the song "Use This Gospel" on DJ Khaled's new album God Did. The remix was originally set to be released on West's shelved album Jesus Is King Part II. The song features production from Dr. Dre and his production team called the ICU.

Eminem was inducted into the Rock and Roll Hall of Fame in 2022. He was presented by Dr. Dre and had special guest appearances by Aerosmith lead vocalist Steven Tyler and Ed Sheeran during his performance.

Artistry

Influences, style and rapping technique 
Eminem has cited several MCs as influencing his rapping style, including Esham, Kool G Rap, Masta Ace, Big Daddy Kane, Newcleus, Ice-T, Mantronix, Melle Mel (on "The Message"), LL Cool J, Beastie Boys, Run-D.M.C., Rakim and Boogie Down Productions.
In How to Rap, Guerilla Black notes that Eminem studied other MCs to hone his rapping technique: "Eminem listened to everything and that's what made him one of the greats". In the book, other MCs also praise aspects of his rapping technique: varied, humorous subject matter, connecting with his audience, carrying a concept over a series of albums, complex rhyme schemes, bending words so they rhyme, multisyllabic rhymes, many rhymes to a bar, complex rhythms, clear enunciation, and the use of melody and syncopation. Eminem is known to write most of his lyrics on paper (documented in The Way I Am), taking several days or a week to craft lyrics, being a "workaholic" and "stacking" vocals. Examples of hip hop subgenres that Eminem's music has been described as include horrorcore, comedy hip hop, and hardcore hip hop. Eminem also incorporates rap rock into his music and has cited rock acts during the 1970s and 1980s, such as Jimi Hendrix and Led Zeppelin, as influences in his music.

Alter egos 
Eminem uses alter egos in his songs for different rapping styles and subject matter. His best-known alter ego, Slim Shady, first appeared on the Slim Shady EP and was in The Slim Shady LP, The Marshall Mathers LP, The Eminem Show, Encore, Relapse, The Marshall Mathers LP 2, Kamikaze and Music to Be Murdered By. In this persona, his songs are violent and dark, with a comic twist. Eminem downplayed Slim Shady on Recovery because he felt it did not fit the album's theme. Another character is Ken Kaniff, a homosexual who pokes fun at Eminem's songs. Ken was created and originally played by fellow Detroit rapper Aristotle on the Slim Shady LP, where Kaniff makes a prank call to Eminem. An argument after the album's release prompted Eminem to use the Kaniff character on Marshall Mathers and later albums (except Encore and Recovery). Aristotle, angry with Eminem's use of his character, released a mixtape in his Kaniff persona ridiculing him.

Collaborations and productions 

Although Eminem usually collaborates with Aftermath Entertainment and Shady Records rappers such as Dr. Dre, 50 Cent, D12, Obie Trice and Yelawolf, he has also worked with Redman, Kid Rock, DMX, Lil Wayne, Missy Elliott, Jay Z, Drake, Rihanna, Nas, Nicki Minaj, Xzibit, Method Man, Jadakiss, Fat Joe, Sticky Fingaz, T.I. and Young Jeezy. Eminem rapped a verse in a live performance of Busta Rhymes' "Touch It" remix at the 2006 BET Music Awards. He appeared on Akon's single "Smack That" from Konvicted, Lil Wayne's hit "Drop the World" and "My Life" (the lead single from 50 Cent's Street King Immortal).

Eminem was the executive producer of D12's first two albums (Devil's Night and D12 World), Obie Trice's Cheers and Second Round's on Me and 50 Cent's Get Rich or Die Tryin' and The Massacre. He has produced songs for other rappers such as Jadakiss' "Welcome To D-Block", Jay-Z's "Renegade" and "Moment of Clarity", Lloyd Banks' "On Fire", "Warrior Part 2" and "Hands Up", Tony Yayo's "Drama Setter", Trick-Trick's "Welcome 2 Detroit" and Xzibit's "My Name" and "Don't Approach Me". Most of The Eminem Show was produced by Eminem and his longtime collaborator, Jeff Bass, and Eminem co-produced Encore with Dr. Dre. In 2004, Eminem was co-executive producer of 2Pac's posthumous album Loyal to the Game with Shakur's mother, Afeni. He produced the UK number-one single "Ghetto Gospel", featuring Elton John; "The Cross", from the Nas album God's Son; and eight tracks on Obie Trice's 2006 album Second Round's on Me (also appearing on "There They Go"). Eminem produced several tracks on Trick-Trick's The Villain (appearing on "Who Want It") and produced four tracks on Cashis' 2013 album The County Hound 2.

Eminem has only produced for and appeared on one track with former Aftermath/Interscope labelmate The Game; "We Ain't" (a track from Game's January 2005 debut album, The Documentary). In 2022, Game would later release a ten-minute diss track towards Eminem titled "The Black Slim Shady".

Eminem is considered unusual in structuring his songs around the lyrics, rather than writing to beats. One exception was "Stan", which came from an idea and scratch track produced by the 45 King. After doing little production on Relapse and Recovery, Eminem produced a significant portion of The Marshall Mathers LP 2. He said about producing his own music, "Sometimes, I may get something in my head, like an idea or the mood of something that I would want, and I'm not always gonna get that by going through different tracks that other people have made. They don't know what's in my head. I think maybe it helps, a little bit, with diversity, the sound of it, but also, I would get something in my head and want to be able to lay down that idea from scratch." In 1998 when his beef with rapper Cage was still happening, New York rapper Necro (who had previously produced three songs for Cage) met Eminem and gave him a CD with the beat to what eventually became the beat for the song "Black Helicopters" by rap group Non-Phixion. Despite Eminem never using it, Necro still said positive things about Eminem and would appear on Shade45 years later.

Comparisons with other artists 
As a white performer prominent in a genre influenced by black artists, Eminem has been compared, much to his chagrin, to Elvis Presley, and has lyrically been compared to Bob Dylan. Rapper Asher Roth has been compared to Eminem and Roth devoted a song on his album ("As I Em") to him, which he took offense to. The accomplished trumpeter Nicholas Payton has called Eminem "the Bix Beiderbecke of hip hop".

Other ventures

Shady Records 

Following Eminem's multiplatinum record sales, Interscope offered him his own label; he and Paul Rosenberg founded Shady Records in late 1999. Eminem signed his Detroit collective, D12 and rapper Obie Trice to the label and signed 50 Cent in a 2002 joint venture with Dr. Dre's Aftermath label. In 2003, Eminem and Dr. Dre added Atlanta rapper Stat Quo to the Shady-Aftermath roster. DJ Green Lantern, Eminem's former DJ, was with Shady Records until a dispute related to the 50 Cent-Jadakiss feud forced him to leave the label. The Alchemist is currently Eminem's tour DJ. In 2005 Eminem signed another Atlanta rapper, Bobby Creekwater and West Coast rapper Cashis to Shady Records.

On December 5, 2006, the compilation album Eminem Presents: The Re-Up was released on Shady Records. The project began as a mixtape, but when Eminem found the material better than expected he released it as an album. The Re-Up was intended to introduce Stat Quo, Cashis and Bobby Creekwater. While he was recording Infinite, Eminem, Proof and Kon Artis assembled a group of fellow rappers now known as D12, short for "Detroit Twelve" or "Dirty Dozen", who performed in a style similar to Wu-Tang Clan. In 2001 D12's debut album, Devil's Night, was released. The first single from the album was "Shit on You", followed by "Purple Pills" (an ode to recreational drug use) and "Fight Music". "Purple Pills" was rewritten for radio and television, removing many of the song's references to drugs and sex and renamed "Purple Hills".

After their debut, D12 took a three-year break from the studio. They reunited in 2004 for their second album, D12 World, which included the hit singles "My Band" and "How Come". "American Psycho 2" featuring Cypress Hill member, B-Real, was another popular hit. According to D12 member Bizarre, Eminem was not featured on his album Blue Cheese & Coney Island because "he's busy doing his thing".

In January 2014, Bass Brothers announced that D12 had returned to record at F.B.T. Studio and they were working on an album with Eminem on at least three songs. Bizarre reported that he was still part of the group and that the album was scheduled for a 2014 release.

Shade 45 

Eminem established his own channel, Shade 45, that plays uncut hip hop. Eminem also established a new morning show, Sway in the Morning with Sway Calloway, a lively morning show that airs at 8:00 a.m., Monday–Friday.

Eminem promoted the station in a 2004 mock national convention (the "Shady National Convention") at the Roseland Ballroom in New York City, in which Donald Trump endorsed him. On his album Revival (2017), Eminem expressed his regret at having collaborated with Trump, rapping, "wish I would have spit on it before I went to shake his hand at the event".

Mom's Spaghetti Restaurant 
On September 29, 2021, Eminem and Union Joints opened a spaghetti restaurant at 2131 Woodward Ave in Detroit. It is a reference to the lyrics "His palms are sweaty, knees weak, arms are heavy / There's vomit on his sweater already, mom's spaghetti" from the song "Lose Yourself" which became an internet meme. Mom's Spaghetti was previously a pop-up in Detroit in 2017 and at Coachella in 2018.

Acting career 
After small roles in the 2001 film The Wash and as an extra in the 1998 Korn music video for "Got the Life" (during which he gave the band a demo tape), Eminem made his Hollywood debut in the semi-autobiographical 2002 film 8 Mile. He said it was a representation of growing up in Detroit rather than an account of his life. He recorded several new songs for the soundtrack, including "Lose Yourself" (which won an Academy Award for Best Original Song in 2003 and became the longest-running No. 1 hip hop single in history). Eminem was absent from the ceremony and co-composer Luis Resto accepted the award.

Eminem voiced an aging, corrupt, Ebonics-speaking police officer in the video game 50 Cent: Bulletproof and guested on the Comedy Central television show Crank Yankers and a Web cartoon, The Slim Shady Show He was signed to star in an unmade film version of Have Gun – Will Travel, and was considered for the role of David Rice in the 2008 film Jumper. Eminem had a cameo appearance, arguing with Ray Romano, in the 2009 film Funny People. In a 2010 interview with Jonathan Ross, he stated "You know, I love music so much. This is my passion, this is what I want to do. Not saying that I won't do a movie ever again, but this is me."

He played himself in the Entourage season-seven finale "Lose Yourself" with Christina Aguilera. Although Eminem was offered the lead role in the 2013 science-fiction film Elysium, he turned it down because director Neill Blomkamp would not change its location from Los Angeles to Detroit. Eminem had a cameo appearance as himself in the 2014 film The Interview. During an interview with the main character, Dave Skylark (James Franco), Eminem satirically comes out as gay.

Charity work 
Eminem established the Marshall Mathers Foundation to aid disadvantaged youth. The foundation works in conjunction with a charity founded by Norman Yatooma, a Detroit attorney. During the COVID-19 pandemic in 2020, he donated a pair of Air Jordan 4 Retro Eminem Carhartt shoes, which are rare, to be raffled off with proceeds going to COVID-19 relief. That same year, he donated "mom's spaghetti", a reference to a line in his song "Lose Yourself", to healthcare workers at Henry Ford Health System in Detroit.

Advertising 
Eminem appeared in two commercials which were shown during Super Bowl XLV. In the first, a one-minute spot for Lipton's Brisk iced tea, he is a claymation figure. In the second, a two-minute ad – the longest in Super Bowl history at the time – for the Chrysler 200, Eminem drives through Detroit (with "Lose Yourself" as the soundtrack) to his show at the Fox Theatre.

Books and memoirs 
On November 21, 2000, Eminem published Angry Blonde, a non-fiction book featuring a commentary of several of his own songs, along with several previously unpublished photographs.

On October 21, 2008, his autobiography The Way I Am was published. The book was first published on October 21, 2008, by Dutton Adult. It is a collection of Eminem's personal stories, reflections, photographs, original artwork, and original lyric sheets from "Stan" and "The Real Slim Shady". It details his struggles with poverty, drugs, fame, heartbreak, family and depression, along with stories about his rise to fame and commentary on past controversies. The book is illustrated with never before published photos of Eminem's life. It also contains original drawings, previously unpublished lyric sheets, and other rare memorabilia. The autobiography is named after the song of the same name.

An autobiography of Eminem's mother (My Son Marshall, My Son Eminem) was published the following month, in which Debbie Nelson describes her childhood and adolescence, meeting Eminem's father and her son's rise to (and struggles with) fame.

Personal life

Family and relationships 
Eminem has been scrutinized, both as a rapper and personality-wise. He was twice married to Kimberly Anne Scott; he met Scott in high school while he stood on a table with his shirt off rapping LL Cool J's "I'm Bad". Scott and her twin sister Dawn had run away from home; they moved in with Eminem and his mother when he was 15 and he began an on-and-off relationship with Scott in 1989.

Mathers and Scott were married in 1999 and divorced in 2001. Although Eminem told Rolling Stone in 2002, "I would rather have a baby through my penis than get married again", he and Scott briefly remarried in January 2006. He filed for divorce in early April, agreeing to joint custody of Hailie. Their daughter, Hailie Jade is a social media influencer, specifically for fashion and beauty.

Eminem was given custody of his ex-sister-in-law Dawn's daughter, Scott's child from another relationship, and his younger half-brother Nathan.

Eminem and actress Britanny Murphy dated in 2000s. He stated in 2002 that he had been dating singer Mariah Carey, though she later denied it. In 2005, he played alleged voicemails of her during the Anger Management Tour and stated in 2006 that he had dated her for six to seven months, but the two broke up due to the differences in their personalities.

In early 2010, Eminem denied tabloid reports that he and Scott had renewed their romantic relationship; however, in the same statement, his representative also confirmed that they now maintain a friendly relationship.

In his 2013 song "Headlights", Eminem apologized to and reiterated his love for his mother.

Health problems 
Eminem has spoken publicly about his addiction to prescription drugs, including Vicodin, Ambien and Valium. According to friend and fellow D12 member Proof, Eminem first straightened out in 2002. During the production of 8 Mile, Eminem, working 16 hours a day, developed insomnia. An associate gave him an Ambien tablet which "knocked [him] out", encouraging him to obtain a prescription. This was Eminem's first experience of drug addiction, which would affect him for several years. Near the end of production on Encore, he would "just go into the studio and goof off [with] a pocketful of pills". Eminem began taking the drugs to "feel normal", taking a "ridiculous amount ... I could consume anywhere from 40 to 60 Valium [in a day]. Vicodin, maybe 30." The drugs would put him to sleep for no more than two hours, after which he would take more. Or I'd sit up at Denny's or Big Boy and just eat by myself. It was sad." Eminem became less recognizable due to his weight gain and once overheard two teenagers arguing about whether or not it was him: "Eminem ain't fat".

2007 overdose 
In December 2007, Eminem was hospitalized after a methadone overdose. He had first bought from a dealer who had told him it was "just like Vicodin, and easier on [your] liver". He continued to buy more until he collapsed in his bathroom one night and was rushed to the hospital. Doctors there told him he had ingested the equivalent of four bags of heroin and was "about two hours from dying". After missing Christmas with his children, Hailie, Alaina and Stevie, Eminem checked himself out of the facility, weak and not fully detoxed. He tore the meniscus in his knee after falling asleep on his sofa, requiring surgery; after he returned home, he had a seizure. His drug use "ramped right back to where it was before" within a month. Eminem began to attend church meetings to get clean, but after he was asked for autographs he sought help from a rehabilitation counselor. He began an exercise program that emphasized running. Elton John was a mentor during this period, calling Eminem once a week to check on him. Eminem has been sober since April 20, 2008.

2020 home invasion 
On April 5, 2020, Matthew Hughes, a 26-year-old homeless man, broke into Eminem's house, breaking a kitchen window with a paving stone. Eminem woke up with Hughes standing behind him and he said that he was there to kill him. Hughes was on a $50,000 cash bond and was charged with first-degree home invasion and malicious destruction of property.

Politics 
Eminem has expressed his political views in multiple songs; however, he has refrained from direct endorsements of politicians, focusing more on criticisms instead. The first was "Mosh", which was released in 2004, a few weeks before the 2004 United States presidential election, and heavily criticized then-president George W. Bush but did not directly endorse John Kerry either. He would not express political views again until the 2016 United States presidential election when he released "Campaign Speech", which criticized presidential candidate Donald Trump. The following year, he criticized Trump in a freestyle titled "The Storm". In the freestyle, he expressed support for former San Francisco 49ers quarterback Colin Kaepernick and the U.S. national anthem protests, and expressed his displeasure for any of his fans that support Trump. In his song "Darkness", he heavily references the 2017 Las Vegas mass shooting, and at the end of the music video expresses his support for gun control. The week before the 2020 United States presidential election, he approved his song "Lose Yourself" to be used in a campaign video for Joe Biden. After the United States Supreme Court overturned Roe v. Wade, Eminem posted a tweet to his Twitter expressing his displeasure for the decision saying "As a father it pisses me off that women have fewer rights 2day than just a few days ago… we r fuckin goin bckwards. Here's how 2 help in Michigan." and included a link to a pro-choice organization in Michigan.

Feuds 
Eminem has had lyrical feuds during his career with many recording artists, including Christina Aguilera, Machine Gun Kelly, Everlast, Cage, Insane Clown Posse, Will Smith, Miilkbone, Mariah Carey, Nick Cannon, Limp Bizkit, Benzino, Ja Rule, Vanilla Ice, Canibus, Jermaine Dupri, Joe Budden, Lord Jamar, and Charlamagne tha God.

Insane Clown Posse 
The feud began in 1997 when Eminem was throwing a party to promote his debut EP, Slim Shady EP. He gave Joseph Bruce (Violent J from Insane Clown Posse) a flyer which stated "Featuring appearances by Esham, Kid Rock, and ICP (maybe)". Bruce asked why Eminem was promoting a possible Insane Clown Posse appearance without first contacting the group. Eminem explained, "It says 'maybe.' Maybe you will be there; I don't know. That's why I'm asking you right now. You guys comin' to my release party, or what?" Bruce, upset over not being consulted, responded, "Fuck no, I ain't coming to your party. We might have, if you would've asked us first, before putting us on the fuckin' flyer like this."

Eminem took Bruce's response as a personal offense, subsequently attacking the group in radio interviews. Bruce and Utsler responded with a parody of Eminem's "My Name Is" entitled "Slim Anus" and other tracks including "Nuttin' But a Bitch Thang" and "Please Don't Hate Me". Eminem insulted Insane Clown Posse on various tracks from his album The Marshall Mathers LP (2000), including "Marshall Mathers" and "Ken Kaniff". In 2002, Eminem briefly dissed them on his single "Business" from The Eminem Show.

Insane Clown Posse talked about the feud being squashed in an interview with MTV, saying that Proof squashed the conflict in 2005, which was followed by a bowling game between members of D12 and Psychopathic Records. Violent J stated that, "He contacted us and we had a bowling game – it was really cool. We're something different. They could have skipped over us and said forget them, but they included us and said let's squash it."

Everlast and Limp Bizkit 
In the early 2000s, Eminem was notified while on the Anger Management Tour that former House Of Pain member Everlast had mocked him on a song. Everlast claimed that while passing by Mathers in a hotel lobby, Mathers gave him a "weird look". Everlast's verse from the Dilated Peoples all star track "Ear Drums Pop (Remix)" contained a thinly veiled reference to Eminem ("Cock my hammer, spit a comet like Haley/I buck a .380 on ones that act shady") and went on to warn "You might catch a beatdown out where I come from" in his recounting of the incident. Taking offense to this, Eminem and D12 quickly began work on a retaliatory song, "I Remember", which ripped Everlast several times in public and with the song.

Eminem & D12 responded with "Quitter", the second half of which is a take off on 2Pac's "Hit 'Em Up" (a diss song aimed at The Notorious B.I.G.). The track ends with the spoken words, "Fuck him, that's it, I'm done, I promise, I'm done, that's it." It was reported that long-time friends of Eminem, Limp Bizkit, were meant to be featured on the song, but Fred Durst canceled at the last moment. The record continued its release without featuring Limp Bizkit, causing the Everlast-Mathers dispute to continue. In a TRL interview, Limp Bizkit member, DJ Lethal, made a statement that if Mathers and Everlast were to fight in real life, Everlast would win. This angered Eminem to the point of rage and an insulting track aimed at both Everlast and Limp Bizkit (namely Durst and Lethal) appeared on D12's mainstream debut, Devil's Night, as the track "Girls". Recently, things seem to have settled and Eminem has no longer been heard insulting Everlast or Limp Bizkit. It is currently unknown if the dispute is resolved.

Canibus 
The animus between Canibus and Eminem started when Canibus and Wyclef Jean confronted Eminem and asked him if he ghost-wrote the track "The Ripper Strikes Back" by LL Cool J. Eminem denied that he wrote the track. After he was confronted, he said Canibus was "rude" to him. Two years later, Canibus went to see Eminem on the Warped Tour and apologized to him for his reactions and asked him if he still wanted the track. Eminem agreed, but when he heard the track "Phuck U" from Canibus' album 2000 B.C., he thought the track was directed at him and LL Cool J. Shortly afterwards, Eminem released his 2nd album The Marshall Mathers LP (2000) and Canibus decided to continue the "story" of Eminem's single "Stan". He titled the track "U Didn't Care" and it continued to take shots at Eminem. Eminem decided to take more shots at Canibus on his album The Eminem Show (2002) on tracks such as "Say What You Say", "When The Music Stops" and "Square Dance". Even though Canibus did not immediately respond to the tracks, Eminem continued to take shots at him, including a track Eminem was featured on with Xzibit, titled "My Name" from Xzibit's album Man vs. Machine. On November 19, 2002, Canibus responded with the track titled" Dr.C PhD". Over a year later Eminem released the track "Can-I-Bitch". He attacked Canibus in a humorous matter. Since then the hostilities have cooled down, but Canibus tried to provoke a re-ignition of it when he leaked a track titled "Air Strike (Pop Killer)", that featured vocal parts of D12, where Canibus takes shots at Eminem and his deceased friend Proof. D12 member Swift responded to the record publicly and had the following to say about DZK (another rapper featured on the track). "[He] asked us to do a track with him when he already was teamed up with Canibus without us knowing. They dissed Em, took our verses, and added them to the song, so they can bring traffic and make it seem like we were turning on Em ... as a desperate attempt to be heard after ducking and dodging Em for 7 years. It was a straight hoe move."

Michael Jackson 
The music video for "Just Lose It" generated controversy by parodying singer Michael Jackson's child molestation trial, plastic surgery and an incident in which Jackson's hair caught on fire while filming a Pepsi commercial in 1984. It was banned on the BET channel, after complaints from Benzino and others (but was later reinstated, as critics of the ban argued that Nelly's "Tip Drill" video could be seen). Both were only seen on BET: Uncut. However MTV did not drop it and the video became one of the most requested on the channel. A week after the release of "Just Lose It", Jackson called in to the radio show of Steve Harvey to report his displeasure with the video. "I am very angry at Eminem's depiction of me in his video", Jackson said in the interview. "I feel that it is outrageous and disrespectful. It is one thing to spoof, but it is another to be demeaning and insensitive." The singer continued: "I've admired Eminem as an artist, and was shocked by this. The video was inappropriate and disrespectful to me, my children, my family and the community at large." Many of Jackson's supporters and friends spoke out about the video, including Stevie Wonder, who called the video "kicking a man while he's down" and "bullshit", and Steve Harvey, who declared, "Eminem has lost his ghetto pass. We want the pass back."

Ja Rule 
Eminem's conflict with Ja Rule started after 50 Cent signed to Shady Records and Aftermath. Ja Rule stated that he had a problem with Eminem and Dr. Dre of signing someone he had conflict with.
On November 19, Ja Rule and Irv Gotti were special guests on Star and Bucwild's morning show on Hot 97 NYC. Gotti claimed to have "legal documents" referring to an order of protection 50 Cent "has on him". Ja Rule threatened, that if 50 Cent released any diss track, he would take action towards his two producers.
However, Dr. Dre was the one who produced 50 Cent's track "Back Down" in 2003 from the album Get Rich Or Die Tryin', which included lyrics insulting not only Murder Inc., but also Ja Rule's mother, wife and children; in the song, he raps, "Your Mami, your Papi, that bitch you chasin' your lil dirty ass kids, I'll fuckin' erase them."

Busta Rhymes decided to join the conflict when he was featured on the track "Hail Mary 2003", with Eminem and 50 Cent.

The feud intensified when Ja Rule released a diss called "Loose Change" in which he took shots at 50 Cent as well as Eminem, calling the latter "Feminem" and Dr. Dre "bisexual" and rapping that Suge Knight knew of Dre "bringing transvestites home". It includes also the lyrics insulting Eminem's famously estranged mother Debbie Mathers, his ex-wife Kim and his then eight-year-old daughter Hailie: "Em you claim your mother's a crack head and Kim is a known slut, so what's Hailie gonna be when she grows up?" Eminem, along with D12 and Obie Trice, responded with the track "Doe Rae Me" (aka "Hailie's Revenge"). Since then, the rift has allegedly cooled down.

Benzino and The Source Magazine 
In 2003, rapper Benzino, a silent co-owner of The Source, released a diss single titled "Pull Your Skirt Up" which took aim at Eminem. The track attacked Eminem's "street cred" and accused him of being a tool of the music industry. Eminem had been discovered by The Source after writer Rigo Morales featured him in the magazine's famed monthly "Unsigned Hype" column.

In the same year, The Source released an article written by Kimberly Osorio which identified and researched the history of an old demo tape that the magazine discovered where Eminem insulted Black women and used the word "nigger". The demo featured a song called "Foolish Pride", recorded in the late 1980s when Eminem claimed to have been "dumped" by his African-American then-girlfriend. Eminem responded with two tracks titled "Nail in the Coffin" and "The Sauce". Benzino would later release more tracks. As a result of the conflict, Shady/Aftermath ads were pulled from the magazine. XXL, which had featured negative coverage of Shady/Aftermath artists since Eminem mocked them in "Marshall Mathers" from the Marshall Mathers L.P., stepped in to fill the void, accepting Shady/Aftermath ads.

Mariah Carey and Nick Cannon 
Eminem has written several songs referring to a relationship with R&B singer Mariah Carey, although she denies that they were ever intimate. Eminem has referenced her on many songs, including "When the Music Stops", "Superman", "Jimmy Crack Corn", "Bagpipes from Baghdad" and "The Warning". While "Superman" was released in 2003, Carey released a song entitled "Clown" on her album Charmbracelet, released in 2002, which makes similar references in line with her 2009 hit "Obsessed".

Eminem's "Bagpipes from Baghdad" from his album Relapse disparages Carey and husband Nick Cannon's relationship. Cannon responded to Eminem by saying his career is based on "racist bigotry" and that he would get revenge on Eminem, joking that he may return to rapping. Eminem later stated that the couple misinterpreted the track and it was wishing the two the best. Cannon also stated that there were no hard feelings and that he just had to express his feelings about the song.

In 2009, Carey released "Obsessed", about an obsessed man who claims to have a relationship with her. Cannon claimed that the song was not an insult directed at Eminem. However, Eminem responded in late July 2009 by releasing a track titled "The Warning". It contained samples of voice mail recordings which Eminem claimed were left by Carey when the two were together. Eminem also hinted that he had other evidence of their relationship in his possession. A little over a year later in September 2010, Cannon responded with the song "I'm a Slick Rick", making fun of Eminem.

Moby 
After the release of The Marshall Mathers LP, popular electronic music artist Moby began speaking out against the album's lyrics, citing references to misogyny and homophobia as unacceptable. Eminem responded back with insulting Moby in "Without Me", the lead single off his next album The Eminem Show.

In 2004, Moby praised Eminem for criticizing then-U.S. president George W. Bush in the song "Mosh", a track from Encore. The feud has since ended.

From Kamikaze 
Throughout the album, lyrics criticize other musicians, primarily mumble rappers, and several have responded publicly. Eminem and rapper Machine Gun Kelly have had an ongoing feud for several years, and Kelly released a diss track in response to "Not Alike" titled "Rap Devil" on September 3; both songs were produced by Ronny J. Kelly continued the feud at a concert, calling it "a battle between the past and the fucking future". The song's title refers to Eminem's "Rap God" and Eminem went into the studio days later to record his own response, as did former D12 associate Bizarre. Eminem responded with "Killshot" on September 14 and Bizarre's "Love Tap" was released on September 20. "Killshot" garnered 38.1 million streams on YouTube in its first 24 hours and over 80 million views in its first week, making it the most successful debut for a hip hop song and the third-biggest debut in the platform's history. The track also debuted at number 3 on the Billboard Hot 100, making it Eminem's 20th top 10 hit on the Billboard Hot 100. Kelly has continued the feud publicly. Ja Rule responded on social media, re-igniting a feud the two had 15 years prior. 6ix9ine, Iggy Azalea, Joe Budden, Die Antwoord, Lupe Fiasco, and Lord Jamar have also responded publicly, with 6ix9ine releasing the skit "Legend" that raps over Eminem's "Lose Yourself".

Controversies

Legal issues 
Eminem had his first run-in with the law at age 20, when he was arrested for his involvement in a drive-by shooting with a paintball gun. The case was dismissed when the victim did not appear in court.

On June 3, 2000, Eminem was arrested during an altercation with Douglas Dail at a car-audio store in Royal Oak, Michigan, when he pulled out an unloaded gun and pointed it at the ground. The next day, in Warren, Michigan, he was arrested again for assaulting John Guerra in the parking lot of the Hot Rock Café when he saw him kissing his wife. Eminem recreated the Guerra assault in "The Kiss (Skit)" on The Eminem Show. He pleaded guilty to possession of a concealed weapon and assault, receiving two years' probation; however, Guerra's assault charge was dropped as part of the plea agreement. On June 28, 2001, Eminem was sentenced to one year's probation and community service and was fined about $2,000 on weapon charges stemming from an argument with an employee of Psychopathic Records.

In 1999, Eminem's mother sued him for $10 million, claiming he was slandering her on The Slim Shady LP. Litigation concluded in 2001, resulting in an award of $1,600 for her damages. 

On July 7, 2000, Kim attempted suicide by slitting her wrists, later suing Eminem for defamation after describing her violent death in "Kim".

Sanitation worker DeAngelo Bailey sued Eminem for $1 million in 2001, accusing him of invading his privacy by publicizing information placing him in a false light in "Brain Damage", a song that portrays him as a violent school bully. Although Bailey admitted picking on Eminem in school, he said he merely "bumped" him and gave him a "little shove". The lawsuit was dismissed on October 20, 2003; Judge Deborah Servitto, who wrote a portion of her opinion in rap-like rhyming verse, ruled that it was clear to the public that the lyrics were exaggerated.

On March 31, 2002, French jazz pianist Jacques Loussier filed a $10 million lawsuit against Eminem and Dr. Dre, claiming that the beat for "Kill You" was taken from his instrumental "Pulsion". Loussier demanded that sales of The Marshall Mathers LP be halted and any remaining copies destroyed. The case was later settled out of court.

In 2006, Eminem was accused of assaulting Miad Jarbou, a resident of Royal Oak, Michigan, in the bathroom of a Detroit strip club, but was never charged. Two years later, Jarbou sued Eminem for more than $25,000 in damages.

In 2007, Eminem's music-publishing company (Eight Mile Style) and Martin Affiliated sued Apple Inc. and Aftermath Entertainment, claiming that Aftermath was not authorized to negotiate a deal with Apple for digital downloads of 93 Eminem songs on Apple's iTunes. The case against Apple was settled shortly after the trial began, in late September 2009.

In July 2010, the United States Court of Appeals for the Ninth Circuit ruled in F.B.T. Productions, LLC v. Aftermath Records that F.B.T. Productions and Eminem were owed a royalty of 50 percent of Aftermath's net revenue from licensing his recordings to companies such as Apple, Sprint Corporation, Nextel Communications, Cingular and T-Mobile. In March 2011, the Supreme Court of the United States declined to hear the case.

In October 2013, Eminem sampled Chicago-based rap group Hotstylz's 2008 viral hit, "Lookin' Boy", for his 2013 hit single "Rap God". The group claims that Eminem did not receive permission to use the sample, nor did he credit or compensate them. In November 2013, Hotstylz released a diss track towards Eminem titled "Rap Fraud", where they sample several of his songs and criticize him for not crediting them. In January 2015, TMZ reported that Hotstylz was suing Eminem and his label, Shady Records, for $8 million, for using the 25-second sample of "Lookin' Boy" on his song "Rap God" without their permission.

United States Secret Service 
On December 8, 2003, the United States Secret Service reported that it was "looking into" allegations that Eminem threatened U.S. president George W. Bush in "We As Americans" (an unreleased bootleg at the time), with the lyrics: "Fuck money, I don't rap for dead presidents. I'd rather see the president dead, it's never been said but I set precedents." The incident was included in the video for "Mosh", as a newspaper clipping on a wall with articles about unfortunate incidents in Bush's career. "We As Americans" eventually appeared on Encores deluxe-edition bonus disc, with altered lyrics.

In 2018–2019, the Secret Service interviewed Eminem again regarding threatening lyrics towards president Donald Trump and daughter Ivanka.

Allegations of homophobia 
Some of Eminem's lyrics have been considered homophobic and an Australian politician attempted to ban him from the country. Eminem denies the charge, saying that when he was growing up words such as "faggot" and "queer" were used generally in a derogatory manner and not specifically toward homosexuals. During a 2010 60 Minutes interview, journalist Anderson Cooper explored the issue:

Eminem was accused yet again of using homophobic words in his lyrics in "Rap God" (2013) and explained "I don't know how to say this without saying it how I've said it a million times. But that word, those kind of words, when I came up battle-rappin' or whatever, I never really equated those words ... (to actually mean homosexual)".

Eminem is a friend of gay singer Elton John, and publicly supports gay rights. When asked in an interview with The New York Times about the subject of same-sex marriage being legalized in his home state of Michigan, Eminem responded, "I think if two people love each other, then what the hell? I think that everyone should have the chance to be equally miserable, if they want", explaining that his "overall look on things is a lot more mature than it used to be."

Canada
On October 26, 2000, Eminem was scheduled to perform at Toronto's SkyDome when Ontario Attorney General Jim Flaherty said that Eminem should not be allowed to enter the country. "I personally don't want anyone coming to Canada who will come here and advocate violence against women", he said. Flaherty also said that he was "disgusted" when he read the lyrics of "Kill You", which includes the lines "Slut, you think I won't choke no whore / Till the vocal cords don't work in her throat no more?" Although public reaction to Flaherty's position was generally negative, with barring Eminem from the country considered a free-speech issue, Liberal MPP Michael Bryant suggested that hate crime charges should be brought against Eminem for advocating violence against women in his lyrics. Robert Everett-Green wrote in a Globe and Mail editorial, "Being offensive is Eminem's job description". Eminem's Toronto concert went on as planned.

Legacy 
Credited for popularizing hip hop to a Middle American audience, Eminem's unprecedented global commercial success and acclaimed works for a white rapper is widely recognized for breaking racial barriers for the acceptance of white rappers in popular music. Rising from rags to riches, Eminem's anger-fueled music represented widespread angst and the reality of American underclass. He has been greatly influential for artists of various genres.

Stephen Hill, the then vice president of African American-themed television network BET (Black Entertainment Television), said in 2002:Eminem gets a pass in the same vein that back during segregation black folks had to be better than average, had to be the best, to be accepted ... he is better than the best. In his own way, he is the best lyricist, alliterator and enunciator out there in hip-hop music. In terms of rapping about the pain that other disenfranchised people feel, there is no one better at their game than Eminem.

In 2002, the BBC said that the perception of Eminem as a "modern-day William Shakespeare" was comparable to the reception of American singer Bob Dylan: "Not since Bob Dylan's heyday in the mid-1960s has an artist's output been subjected to such intense academic scrutiny as an exercise in contemporary soul-searching. US critics point to [Eminem's] vivid portraits of disenfranchised lives – using the stark, direct language of the street – as an accurate reflection of social injustice." In addition, the BBC highlighted that, "Where parents once recoiled in horror [to his music], there now seems a greater willingness to acknowledge a music that is striking such a chord among the American young, angry white underclass." Dan Ozzi of Vice highlighted that Eminem during the early 2000s was "the one artist high school kids seemed to unanimously connect with.... he represented everything high school years are about: blind rage, misguided rebellion, adolescent frustration. He was like a human middle finger. An X-rated Dennis the Menace for a dial-up modem generation."

Writing for Spin in 2002, rock critic Alan Light compared Eminem to the Beatles' John Lennon:

Regarding his rehearsal with Eminem for the "Stan" duet at the 2001 Grammy Awards, English singer Elton John said, "[When] Eminem made his entrance, I got goose bumps, the likes of which I have not felt since I first saw Jimi Hendrix, Mick Jagger, James Brown and Aretha Franklin. Eminem was that good. I just thought, 'Fuck, this man is amazing.' There are very few performers who can grab you like that the first time — only the greats." John further praised Eminem, saying, "Eminem is a true poet of his time, someone we'll be talking about for decades to come. He tells stories in such a powerful and distinctive way. As a lyricist, he's one of the best ever. Eminem does for his audience what [Bob] Dylan did for his: He writes how he feels. His anger, vulnerability and humor come out."Concerning the controversy surrounding Eminem due to his transgressive music, American entertainer Madonna had said, "I like the fact that Eminem is brash and angry and politically incorrect ... He's stirring things up, he's provoking a discussion, he's making people's blood boil. He's reflecting what's going on in society right now. That is what art is supposed to do." American musician Stevie Wonder also said, "Rap to me is a modern bluesa statement of how and where people are at ... I think art is a reflection of our society, and people don't like to confront the realities in society ... But until we really confront the truth, we are going to have a Tupac or Eminem or Biggie Smalls to remind us about itand thank God. They force people to look at realities in society."

Eminem has been credited with boosting the careers of hip hop proteges such as 50 Cent, Yelawolf, Stat Quo, Royce da 5'9", Cashis, Obie Trice, Bobby Creekwater, Boogie and hip hop groups such as D12 and Slaughterhouse. A number of artists have cited Eminem as an influence, including The Weeknd, Logic, Joyner Lucas, Lil Wayne, 50 Cent, Kendrick Lamar, Ed Sheeran, J. Cole, Chance the Rapper, Regina Spektor, Lana Del Rey, and Juice WRLD.

Achievements and honors 

With global sales of over 220 million records, Eminem is one of the best-selling music artists of all time. He has had thirteen number-one albums on the Billboard 200: nine solo, two with D12 and one with Bad Meets Evil. He was the best-selling music artist from 2000 to 2009 in the US according to Nielsen SoundScan. He was also the best-selling male music artist in the United States of the 2010s. He has sold 47.4 million albums in the country and 107.5 million singles in the US. The Marshall Mathers LP, The Eminem Show, Curtain Call: The Hits, "Lose Yourself", "Love the Way You Lie" and "Not Afraid" have all been certified Diamond or higher by the Recording Industry Association of America (RIAA). Eminem has over ten billion views of his music videos on his YouTube Vevo page, and in 2014 Spotify named him the most-streamed music artist of all time.

Among Eminem's awards is 15 Grammy Awards, eight American Music Awards and 17 Billboard Music Awards, Billboard named him the "Artist of the Decade (2000–2009)". In 2013, he received the Global Icon Award at that year's MTV Europe Music Awards ceremony. His success in 8 Mile saw him win the 2002 Academy Award for Best Original Song for his song "Lose Yourself", co-written with Jeff Bass and Luis Resto, making him the first rapper to receive the award. He also won the MTV Movie & TV Awards for Best Actor in a Movie and Best Breakthrough Performance and the Critics' Choice Movie Award for Best Song for "Lose Yourself".

Eminem has also been included and ranked in several publications' lists. Rolling Stone included him in its list of the 100 Greatest Artists of All Time and the 100 Greatest Songwriters of All Time. He was ranked 9th on MTV's Greatest MCs of All Time list. He was ranked 13th on MTV's 22 Greatest Voices in Music list and 79th on the VH1 100 Greatest Artists of All Time lists. He was ranked 82nd on Rolling Stones "The Immortals" list. In 2010, MTV Portugal ranked Eminem the 7th biggest icon in popular music history. In 2012, The Source ranked him 6th on their list of the Top 50 Lyricists of All Time, while About.com ranked him 7th on its list of the 50 Greatest MCs of Our Time (1987–2007). In 2015, Eminem was placed third on "The 10 Best Rappers of All Time" list by Billboard. In 2008, Vibe readers named Eminem the Best Rapper Alive. In 2011, Eminem was labelled the "King of Hip-Hop" by Rolling Stone based on an analysis of album sales, chart positions, YouTube views, social media following, concert grosses, industry awards and critical ratings of solo rappers who released music from 2009 to the first half of 2011.
Eminem was also inducted in the Rock and Roll Hall of Fame Class of 2022, alongside Duran Duran and Dolly Parton.

Discography 

Studio albums
 Infinite (1996)
 The Slim Shady LP (1999)
 The Marshall Mathers LP (2000)
 The Eminem Show (2002)
 Encore (2004)
 Relapse (2009)
 Recovery (2010)
 The Marshall Mathers LP 2 (2013)
 Revival (2017)
 Kamikaze (2018)
 Music to Be Murdered By (2020)

Collaborative albums

 Devil's Night (with D12) (2001)
 D12 World (with D12) (2004)
 Hell: The Sequel (with Bad Meets Evil) (2011)

Concert tours 
As a headliner
 The Slim Shady LP Tour (1999)
 The Recovery Tour (2010–2013)
 Rapture Tour (2014)
 Revival Tour (2018)
 Rapture 2019 (2019)

As a co-headliner
 Up in Smoke Tour (with Dr. Dre, Snoop Dogg, Ice Cube and others) (2000)
 Anger Management Tour (with Limp Bizkit and Papa Roach) (2002–2005)
 The Home & Home Tour (with Jay Z) (2010)
 The Monster Tour (with Rihanna) (2014)

Bibliography

See also 

 Artists with the most number-one European singles
 Honorific nicknames in popular music
 List of artists who reached number one in the United States
 List of best-selling music artists
 List of best-selling music artists in the United States
 List of best-selling singles in the United States
 List of best-selling singles worldwide
 Global Recording Artist of the Year
 List of best-selling albums of the 21st century
 List of best-selling albums
 List of artists who reached number one on the UK Singles Chart

References

Further reading

External links 

 
 
 
 Rock and Roll Hall of Fame bio

 
1972 births
Living people
20th-century American rappers
21st-century American rappers
Aftermath Entertainment artists
American autobiographers
American film producers
American hip hop record producers
American hip hop singers
American male rappers
American male songwriters
American media executives
American music industry executives
American music publishers (people)
American people of English descent
American people of German descent
American people of Luxembourgian descent
American people of Polish descent
American people of Scottish descent
American people of Swiss descent
American philanthropists
American radio producers
American tenors
Best Original Song Academy Award-winning songwriters
Brit Award winners
Culture of Detroit
D12 members
Echo (music award) winners
Grammy Award winners for rap music
Hardcore hip hop artists
Horrorcore artists
Juno Award for International Album of the Year winners
Midwest hip hop musicians
MTV Europe Music Award winners
LGBT-related controversies in music
Obscenity controversies in music
People from St. Joseph, Missouri
People from Warren, Michigan
Primetime Emmy Award winners
Rappers from Detroit
Rappers from Missouri
Record producers from Michigan
Record producers from Missouri
Shady Records artists
Songwriters from Michigan
Songwriters from Missouri
Web Entertainment artists
World Music Awards winners
Writers from Detroit
Writers from Missouri